Albert Hart may refer to:
 Albert Bushnell Hart (1854–1943), American historian, writer, and teacher
Al Hart (actor), actor in The Phantom Fortune etc., often credited as Albert Hall
Albert Hart (politician), Secretary of State of California
Albert Frederick Hart, Canadian diplomat and ambassador
Albert Gailord Hart (1909–1997), American economist and monetary-policy expert

See also
Al Hart, radio personality